The Mahogany Inn, also called the Old Mahogany Inn, is a historic building on the Great Eastern Highway in Mahogany Creek in Western Australia.

Under various owners and tenants, a range of brief histories were produced of the inn, as well as the occasional newspaper article.

The inn has had a range of modifications in surrounding grounds and buildings, however the main building remains intact.

Notes

Hotels in Western Australia
Heritage hotels in Australia
1845 establishments in Australia
State Register of Heritage Places in the Shire of Mundaring